Kevin J. Houser (born August 23, 1977) is a former American football long snapper. He was drafted by the New Orleans Saints in the seventh round of the 2000 NFL Draft. He played college football at Ohio State.

Early years
Houser attended Westlake High School in Westlake, Ohio, where he played football, basketball, and track. In football, he was a tight end, defensive end, and longsnapper, and ended his career with 38 receptions, and 273 tackles.

College career
Houser graduated from The Ohio State University with a degree in Finance. During college, he was a four-year letterman for the Ohio State Football team where he played tight-end and long-snapper. He was the third member of his family to play at Ohio State, following father, Tom (1969–72), and brother Bob (1993–96).

Professional career

New Orleans Saints
Houser was selected by the New Orleans Saints in the seventh round (228th overall) of the 2000 NFL Draft.  no current player had been with the Saints longer. He was the starting long-snapper and a contributor on punt coverages.

Seattle Seahawks
The Seattle Seahawks signed Houser as a free agent on July 23, 2009. He was placed on injured reserve on December 22.

Baltimore Ravens
On December 29, 2010, Houser was signed by the Baltimore Ravens to immediately replace Morgan Cox, who was placed on injured reserve after their game against the Cleveland Browns on December 26. Houser would take over as the long snapper for the Ravens to take them through their 2010 season.

Personal life
Houser is married to Kristen Houser and they have two children, daughter Julia, and son Michael. Houser and his wife, cofounded the Life's a Snap charity foundation that provides financial assistance and services to establish and maintain programs which benefit children with serious or life-threatening illnesses. According to an June 11, 2013 Washington Post report, Houser is being sued by his former teammate Drew Brees for advising him to invest $160,000 in tax credits that turned out to be bogus. The suit is filed in federal court claims the former long snapper, a licensed securities broker, mishandled Brees' money and failed to disclose his own financial interests in the investments he was promoting. Several other Saints players and coaches have also sued Houser. All extant lawsuits have since been settled out of court.

References

1977 births
American football long snappers
Baltimore Ravens players
Living people
New Orleans Saints players
Ohio State Buckeyes football players
Players of American football from Ohio
Seattle Seahawks players